Pingwu County is a county located in the north of Sichuan province, China, bordering Gansu province to the north. It is the northernmost county-level division of the prefecture-level city of Mianyang.

History 
The history of Pingwu goes back over 1,700 years. In 108 CE, the Eastern Han established Guanghan County, which was ruled from present day Wen County. Beginning in the 3rd century CE, a number of kingdoms belonging to the Di tribe were set up in and around Pingwu County. In 280 Pingwu County was first established. The name Pingwu originates from the name of the previous Yinping and Guangwu counties.

In 347, Pingwu became part of the Eastern Jin.

By the 6th century, the Di kingdoms saw their power wane, and much of the area surrounding present-day Pingwu County was integrated into the Yarlung dynasty. Despite this, the area of contemporary Pingwu County was not occupied by the Yarlung dynasty during the 7th century, resulting in a linguistic identity more akin to that of the Di tribe.

Geography and Climate 
Pingwu is a mountainous county located along the upper reaches of the Fujiang river, in the far northwest of the Sichuan Basin. 94% of the county's area is above 1,000 m elevation.

Economy 
Pingwu is a large production base of Shiitake and wood ear mushroom, with an output of 1.1 million kg in 2009.

Administrative divisions

Pingwu County has six towns, two townships, and twelve ethnic townships.

Towns 

Townships 

Ethnic townships 
Pingwu County has twelve ethnic townships, of which, four have been designated as Qiang ethnic townships, and eight have been designated as Tibetan ethnic townships.

Demographics

Languages 
Pingwu County is one of three counties in Sichuan where the Baima language is spoken.

Attractions
Pingwu county is the center of the biggest remaining giant panda habitat in China, i.e. the Minshan Mountains. Close to the Baima Ethnic Township, for example, the national panda reserve "Wanglang" is located. The WWF has conducted an Integrated Community Development Project in the Baima township to reduce direct and indirect poaching threats to the panda population. A temple named "Baoensi" is also located there.

Fauna
There are two species of Megophryidae frogs endemic to Pingwu County, namely Scutiger pingwuensis and Oreolalax chuanbeiensis.

Notable residents 

 Li Ziqi (vlogger)

See also
1976 Songpan-Pingwu earthquake

References

External links
Official website of Pingwu County Government
local WWF panda info

 
County-level divisions of Sichuan
Mianyang